Gracillaria verina is a moth of the family Gracillariidae. It is known from Rapa Iti in French Polynesia.

The wingspan is 10 mm.

References

Gracillariinae
Moths described in 1971